Andy S. Childs (November 12, 1905 – November 25, 1977) was an American Negro league second baseman in the 1930s.

A native of Pine Bluff, Arkansas, Childs made his Negro leagues debut in 1937 with the Indianapolis Athletics. He went on to play for the Memphis Red Sox the following season. Childs died in San Diego, California in 1977 at age 72.

References

External links
 and Seamheads
 Andy Childs at Arkansas Baseball Encyclopedia

1905 births
1977 deaths
Indianapolis Athletics players
Memphis Red Sox players
Baseball second basemen
Baseball players from Arkansas
Sportspeople from Pine Bluff, Arkansas
20th-century African-American sportspeople